The VideoBrain Family Computer (model 101) is an 8-bit home computer manufactured by Umtech Incorporated, starting in 1977. It is based on the Fairchild Semiconductor F8 CPU. It was not a large commercial success and was discontinued from the market less than three years after its initial release. Some of its lack of success has been attributed to the decision to substitute the APL/S programming language over the then-standard BASIC. Due to the high cost of RAM memory, it only contained 1 KB. It had a full-travel keyboard, unlike some early home computers that featured membrane keypads (and earlier kit machines that used switches), but with a very non-standard layout. It was designed by David Chung and Albert Yu.

History 
The VideoBrain Family Computer was designed and produced by Umtech Inc., doing business as the VideoBrain Computer Company of California in 1977. It was not widely available, although Macy's department store briefly carried the computer on its shelves. It was sold in various configurations, and the price ranged from $500 to $1100 depending on the accessories chosen. New software for the VideoBrain was available on cartridge, which was a first for home computer systems (Later price reductions brought costs down to $300 for the computer by itself, and $350–900 for the packaged deals).

Available software ranged in price from $20 to $40 for video games and educational software, and $70 to $150 for productivity tools.

Design 

The VideoBrain Family Computer was built around the F8 processor from Fairchild Semiconductor, and featured 1KB of RAM and a 4KB ROM. It was able to output 384 x 336 graphics  and 128 x 56 semigraphic characters in 16 colors, (based on UV-201 and UV-202 proprietary chips) and sound to a connected television set through an RF connector. By far its most striking feature was the 36-key keyboard - though the keyboard of the VideoBrain was poorly designed and difficult to use, keyboards were not available on any of the more common video game consoles of the time. Some popular kit-based computers also typically lacked a keyboard, opting for toggle switches instead. The system also features four joystick ports, a cartridge connector, and an expansion port.

The system included four built-in software titles, available if the unit is powered on without a cartridge inserted - a simple text editor, a clock, a countdown timer, and a Color Bar generator.

Two additional hardware modules were marketed that would extend the capabilities of the VideoBrain. The Expander 1 was an interface to various I/O devices. It allowed users to connect a cassette tape recorder for saving or loading data, and included two RS-232 ports for attaching a printer and the Expander 2. The Expander 2 was a 300 baud acoustic modem used by a single program (Timeshare) that allowed the VideoBrain to act as a terminal when dialed into a compatible mainframe computer.

Additional software was sold on cartridges measuring approximately the size of a Betamax tape. The cartridge interface was unique: unlike most video game systems, VideoBrain cartridges had an exposed strip of conductive traces that simply lie flush against a set of pins on the computer itself. Cartridges could contain up to 12KiB of data.

Patent 4232374 titled "Segment Ordering for Television Receiver Control Unit" describes the VideoBrain display hardware.

Images 

"VideoBrain: Screen Captures" at HCVGM

Software 
Because the VideoBrain computer was discontinued so quickly, fewer than  25 software titles were ever marketed for the system. The library comprises a handful of games, educational titles, and productivity software.

Released Titles

Announced Titles, Release Status Unknown

Reception 
The VideoBrain largely failed to achieve commercial viability for a number of reasons. Poor design decisions hindered user acceptance; for example, the VideoBrain's confusing and user-unfriendly keyboard made even simple text entry a tedious process. Moreover, the computer did not offer the then-popular programming language BASIC, forcing users to instead adopt APL/S - a far more obscure and difficult programming language.  Finally, the VideoBrain software library had trouble reaching a key audience.  Most available software was aimed at productivity or educational markets, and lacked any variety of entertainment titles.

Perhaps the largest contributor to the VideoBrain's failure was simply a lack of proper marketing and hardware availability. Public understanding of computers in 1977 was significantly lower than it is today, and many potential consumers simply did not understand the benefits of owning a home computer. Additionally, the VideoBrain was mainly sold through mail-order outfits, and only made a brief retail showing at Macy's Department Stores. (By contrast, video game consoles at the time were easily available in a number of department and toy chains, allowing them to far outsell the VideoBrain Computer System).

Albert Yu said, in an 2005 interview, said he had invited Andy Grove to look over the system and he was skeptical – wondering who would want to buy a computer for the home. Yu also said Grove was skeptical about the Apple II as well but Yu felt that the Apple was successful because it targeted a market (computer enthusiasts) that was easier to sell to. The Apple was also quite a bit more powerful and more expensive. It was an open system, with many expansion slots and fully documented software and hardware – to target the enthusiast community. Although it lacked lowercase, its keyboard was both full-travel and of a normal layout. The VideoBrain, by contrast, was a much more closed design targeting home users with more simplicity and low cost. Even the keyboard was simplified, in terms of the number of keys. Apple created closed systems designed around simplicity later, such as the original Macintosh (which eschewed slots, hard disk support, and the numeric keypad) and the much later iMac (which eschewed slots and the floppy disk).

See also
 Fairchild Channel F, a video game console built on the same F8 CPU as the VideoBrain.
 Exidy Sorcerer, a competing home computer system at the time
 Interact Home Computer, another competing home computer system

References and footnotes

Further reading 
 Ahl, David H., "Where are they Now? Bally, Interact, and VideoBrain", Creative Computing magazine
 Peak, Mike, "VideoBrain: The Consumer Computer", February 1978, "Interface Age" Magazine, Article.
  - AtariProtos.com VideoBrain Cartridges
 "VideoBrain Family Computer", Popular Science, November 1978, advertisement.
 VideoBrain - Old Computer Museum
 VideoBrain Emulation - VideoBrain emulation info
  - Yahoo Group: Channel F And VideoBrain
 Videobrain Unwrapped by Kevin Horton (aka kevtris)

Home computers
Computer-related introductions in 1977
8-bit computers